The Poetry and People International Poetry Prize is an annual international lifetime achievement award given to poets around the world by the poetry magazine Poetry and People and its founder Huang Lihai. The first “Poetry and People Poet Prize” was awarded in 2005 to Eugénio de Andrade, before it changed its name to “Poetry and People International Poetry Prize”. Recipients since have included Derek Walcott, Lan Lan, Xi Chuan and Rita Dove. The prize was given to Tomas Tranströmer in April 2011, six months before it was announced that he was to be awarded the Nobel Prize for Literature.

Poetry and People Magazine 

Poetry and People magazine was established in 1999 in Guangzhou by the poet Huang Lihai. It has been described by poet Zhai Yongming as “the number 1 people's poetry publication". Special Issues have included "The 70s Generation", "Women's Poetry" and "Poetry in Translation".

Prizewinners 
The prizewinner is selected by Huang Lihai. Past winners are:
 2005: Eugénio de Andrade
 2007: Peng Yanjiao
 2008: Zhang Shuguang
 2009: Lan Lan
 2010: Inna Lisnyanskaya
 2011: Tomas Tranströmer
 2012: Tomaž Šalamun
 2013: Dong Dangzi
 2014: Adam Zagajewski
 2015: Rita Dove and Xi Chuan
 2016: George Szirtes and Derek Walcott
 2017: Hans Magnus Enzensberger
 2021: Gary Snyder

Notes 

Poetry awards